Charles Dalton (1850–1933) was a  Canadian businessman and politician

Charles Dalton may also refer to:

Charles Dalton (actor) (1864–1942), American stage actor
Chuck Dalton (1927–2013), Canadian basketball player
Charlie Dalton, Irish revolutionary